The 2015–16 Big East Conference men's basketball season began with practices in October 2015, followed by the start of the followed by the start of the 2015–16 NCAA Division I men's basketball season in November. The season marked the 37th year in the conference's history, but the third as a non-football conference, which officially formed on July 1, 2013. Conference play began on December 30, 2015, and concluded in March with the 2016 Big East men's basketball tournament at Madison Square Garden in New York.

Villanova won the regular season championship by two games over Xavier with a 16–2 conference record. However, Seton Hall, who finished in third, won the Big East tournament, defeating Villanova in the championship game. Providence's Kris Dunn was named the conference's player of the year for the second straight year, while Seton Hall coach Kevin Willard and Villanova coach Jay Wright shared coach of the year.

Creighton received a bid to the National Invitation Tournament and lost in the quarterfinals.

Villanova, Xavier, Seton Hall, Providence and Butler all received bids to the NCAA tournament. Only Villanova advanced past the Second Round of the Tournament. On April 4, Villanova defeated North Carolina in the National Championship game to win the school's second NCAA Championship. Ryan Arcidiacono was named the Most Outstanding Player of the tournament.

Preseason

() first place votes

Preseason All-Big East teams

Rankings

Regular season

Conference matrix
This table summarizes the head-to-head results between teams in conference play.

Honors and awards

All-Americans

All-Big East awards and teams

Coaches

Postseason

Big East tournament

  March 9–12, 2016 Big East Conference Basketball Tournament, Madison Square Garden, New York City.

Seeds
All 10 Big East schools participate in the tournament. Teams were seeded by the 2015–16 Big East Conference season record. The top 6 teams received a first round bye. Seeding for the tournament was determined at the close of the regular conference season.

Schedule

Bracket

NCAA tournament

The Big East Conference had five bids to the 2016 NCAA Division I men's basketball tournament.

National Invitational tournament 

Creighton earned the sole NIT bid for the conference.

References

External links
Big East website